is a public high school in Susono, Shizuoka, Japan. This school is usually called .

History
In 1903 Shizuoka Prefectural Susono High School was established as "Sano Agricultural Mechanics School", then in 1921 it became "Shizuokoa-ken Sano Business School". In 1948 the school was renamed "Shizuoko Prefectural Namazu Agricultural High School Sano Pasture", and finally in 1953 the school "Shizuoka Prefectural Susono High School" became independent from "Shizuoka Prefectural Numazu Agricultural High School".

Location
The School is located at 410-1118, 901-1 Sano, Susono-shi, Shizuoka-ken, Japan.

References

External links
Official Website(Japanese)
Shizuoka Prefecture
Susono city (Japanese)

High schools in Shizuoka Prefecture
Schools in Shizuoka Prefecture
Educational institutions established in 1903
1903 establishments in Japan